Minoru Ito may refer to:

, Japanese ice hockey player
, Japanese sport shooter
, a Japanese mangaka